Overland is a city in St. Louis County, Missouri, United States. The population was 16,062 at the 2010 census.

History
The area south of the King's Road to St. Charles was first settled in the early 1820s, when travelers westward from St. Louis would stop overnight at what became known as "The Overland Park". Daniel Boone, noted frontiersman, constructed a single room cabin here, near the current location of Lake Sherwood and Wyland Elementary School.

In time, businesses were established and a one-room subscription school, the Buck School, was built in 1846.  In 1867, the Ritenour School District was organized.  In 1919, the town's name was shortened to "Overland", to avoid postal confusion with the city of Overland Park, Kansas.

The town was incorporated as a fourth class city in 1939 with a mayoral-city council government. In the 1990s, the city voters approved a change to a third class city.  In 2007, the city voted to move to a mayor-council-administrator form of government. Under this structure, the mayor serves as the chief elected official.  The city council serves as the legislative body, and is empowered to pass ordinances and resolutions it deems necessary to the operation of the city. The city administrator is a full-time employee of the city, and executes the day-to-day tasks of operations.

On April 3, 2007, Overland residents voted to recall Mayor Ann Purzner, who had been accused of lying about her career credentials and exceeding her power as mayor. She was temporarily replaced by Alderman Jerry May, and in the August 2007 election, Councilman Mike Schneider was elected mayor.

Geography

Demographics

2020 census
As of the 2020 census, there were 15,955 people living in the city. The racial makeup of the city was 55.9% White, 22.7% African American, 0.8% Native American, 3.2% Asian, 8.7% from other races, and 8.6% from two or more races. Hispanic or Latino of any race were 13.1% of the population.

2010 census
As of the census of 2010, there were 16,062 people, 6,717 households, and 4,136 families living in the city. The racial makeup of the city was 73.3% White, 16.4% African American, 0.3% Native American, 3.2% Asian, 3.9% from other races, and 3.0% from two or more races. Hispanic or Latino of any race were 6.4% of the population.

There were 6,717 households, of which 30.2% had children under the age of eighteen living with them, 37.5% were married couples living together, 17.7% had a female householder with no husband present, 6.3% had a male householder with no wife present, and 38.4% were non-families. 30.8% of all households were made up of individuals, and 9.6% had someone living alone who was 65 years of age or older. The average household size was 2.38 and the average family size was 2.96.

The median age in the city was 37.9 years. 22.4% of residents were under the age of eighteen; 8.7% were between the ages of 18 and 24; 28% were from 25 to 44; 28.3% were from 45 to 64; and 12.7% were 65 years of age or older. The gender makeup of the city was 49.0% male and 51.0% female.

2000 census
As of the census of 2000, there were 16,838 people, 7,012 households, and 4,494 families living in the city. The racial makeup of the city was 83.56% White, 11.19% African American, 0.32% Native American, 2.01% Asian, 0.03% Pacific Islander, 0.83% from other races, and 2.05% from two or more races. Hispanic or Latino of any race were 2.19% of the population.

There were 7,012 households, out of which 29.7% had children under the age of 18 living with them, 42.8% were married couples living together, 16.4% had a female householder with no husband present, and 35.9% were non-families. 29.7% of all households were made up of individuals, and 11.6% had someone living alone who was 65 years of age or older. The average household size was 2.40 and the average family size was 2.96.

In the city, the population was spread out, with 24.7% under the age of 18, 8.3% from 18 to 24, 30.9% from 25 to 44, 21.0% from 45 to 64, and 15.1% who were 65 years of age or older. The median age was 37 years. For every 100 females age 18 and over, there were 89.2 males.

The median income for a household in the city was $34,437, and the median income for a family was $43,655. Males had a median income of $31,168 versus $25,352 for females. The per capita income for the city was $18,266. About 6.6% of families and 9.7% of the population were below the poverty line, including 13.8% of those under age 18 and 3.6% of those age 65 or over.

Economy
Build-A-Bear Workshop was headquartered until 2020 in Overland, and concentrate manufacturing operations for Dr Pepper Snapple Group are located in Overland. Overland is less than five miles from the St. Louis Boeing plant, Monsanto and Emerson Electric, where many Overland residents are employed. Overland supports a healthy and prosperous retail district.

Overland was the location of the National Personnel Records Center, which houses discharged and retired service records of all branches of the United States armed forces. The city was also the location of the Army Human Resources Command (HRC), prior to the facility's closing as a result of the military's 2005 Base Realignment and Closure process. The former Army HRC building is now called the Charles F. Prevedel Federal Building and is home to offices of the Department of Veterans Affairs and Department of Agriculture.

Arts and culture
The following properties in Overland have been identified as county landmarks:
 Lackland House, built around 1844, with 13 glass panes at the front door and 13 crossbars on the front porch, to commemorate the original 13 states.
 Alexander McElhinney Log House, a dogtrot log home built in the 1850s; moved and restored in the 1980s.
 Wild Acres Park, a  estate and Renaissance Revival home built in 1907; purchased by the city and opened as Wild Acres Park in 1995.
 Gocke-Vance House, a fireproof home built in 1910, based on a Frank Lloyd Wright design.
 King Scott’s Trampoline, a delightful blue and black ring of fun.

The U.S. Army Publications Distribution Center in Overland is listed on the National Register of Historic Places.

Education
The Ritenour School District serves the city. Ritenour High School serves the city.

Notable people
 Maj. Gen. James L. Day, USMC, Medal of Honor recipient
 Ron Hunt, major league baseball second baseman 
 Mike Keefe, editorial cartoonist for The Denver Post
 Ted Kulongoski, Governor of Oregon 2003-2011
 Gene Louis, drummer and lead singer of Bullets and Octane
 Dan Marsala, lead singer of Story of the Year
 Jerry Reuss, major league baseball pitcher and broadcaster
 Bob Scheffing, major league baseball catcher, manager of Detroit Tigers and Chicago Cubs, general manager of New York Mets
 Dave Spence, businessman and Republican nominee for Governor of Missouri in 2012
 Bob Todd, retired head baseball coach at Ohio State University
 Billie Lou Watt, stage and television actress

References

External links
 City of Overland official website

Cities in St. Louis County, Missouri
Cities in Missouri